Pontlottyn Blast Furnace A.F.C. were a Welsh football club from the village of Pontlottyn, in the county borough of Caerphilly, Wales. They played in the Welsh Football League for 34 seasons. The club folded in 2003 before reforming in 2008 as Pontlottyn A.F.C.

History

Pontlottyn Town
The Association football club was formed in 1898 with the first season of the club seeing them playing 24 matches with 15 matches won, 5 lost and 4 drawn. A club called Pontollyn Town A.F.C. won the Second Division of the Glamorgan League in 1909–10.

Pontlottyn
A club called Pontlottyn F.C. appeared in the Welsh Football League in the 1920s.

Pontlottyn Blast Furnace
The club joined the Welsh Football League for the 1969–70 season and remained a league member for 34 seasons before withdrawing from the league after the end of the 2002–03 season citing lack of players.

Pontlottyn AFC
Another club, Pontlottyn AFC was formed in 2008 using the same ground.  The team joined the Taff Ely and Rhymney Valley League, before gaining promotion to the South Wales Senior League where they moved up the top division after finishing runners-up in Division Two at the end of the 2012–13 season. In the final season of that division in 2014–15, the club were Division One champions. They came within a game of a return to the Welsh Football League, losing the play-off final to STM Sports at the Cardiff City Stadium in 2015.  The club subsequently played in the new merged South Wales Alliance League, but were relegated from the Premier Division.  The club again folded in the summer of 2019.

Honours

Pontollyn Blast Furnace

Welsh Football League Division One (Third Tier of Pyramid) – Champions: 1983–84
Welsh Football League Division One (Second Tier of Pyramid) – Runners-Up: 1976–77

Pontollyn AFC

South Wales Senior League Division One – Champions: 2014–15
South Wales Senior League Division Two – Runners-Up: 2012–13

Welsh Football League history
Information sourced from the Football Club History Database and the Welsh Soccer Archive.

Notes

References

1898 establishments in Wales
2003 disestablishments in Wales
2008 establishments in Wales
2019 disestablishments in Wales
South Wales Alliance League clubs
South Wales Senior League clubs
Welsh Football League clubs
Association football clubs established in 1898
Association football clubs disestablished in 2003
Association football clubs established in 2008
Association football clubs disestablished in 2019
Defunct football clubs in Wales
Works association football teams in Wales
South Wales League clubs